The Sandy Point Site, or Sandy Point Archeological Site, is an archaeological site near Ocean City in Worcester County, Maryland.  It contains the southernmost component of the Townsend Series on the Delmarva Peninsula. It is also one of the few known Woodland period village sites in this area.  These traits are shared by the nearby Buckingham Archeological Site.

It was listed on the National Register of Historic Places in 1975.

References

External links
, including photo from 1974, at Maryland Historical Trust

Archaeological sites in Worcester County, Maryland
Archaeological sites on the National Register of Historic Places in Maryland
Native American history of Maryland
Woodland period
Ocean City, Maryland
National Register of Historic Places in Worcester County, Maryland